Lanarkia is a genus of extinct thelodont agnathan which existed in what is now Scotland and Canada during the upper Silurian period.

References

Thelodonti genera
Silurian jawless fish
Silurian fish of Europe
Silurian fish of North America
Paleozoic life of the Northwest Territories